The year 2003 is the ninth year in the history of Fighting Network Rings, a mixed martial arts promotion based in Japan. In 2003 Fighting Network Rings held 7 events beginning with, Rings Lithuania: Ronin.

Events list

Rings Lithuania: Ronin

Rings Lithuania: Ronin was an event held on January 31, 2003 at the Alytus Sports Hall in Alytus, Alytus County, Lithuania.

Results

Rings Holland: Heroes of the Next Generation

Rings Holland: Heroes of the Next Generation was an event held on March 30, 2003 in Utrecht, Holland.

Results

Rings Lithuania: Bushido Rings 7: Adrenalinas

Rings Lithuania: Bushido Rings 7: Adrenalinas was an event held on April 5, 2003 in Vilnius, Lithuania.

Results

Rings Lithuania: Explosion

Rings Lithuania: Explosion was an event held on May 10, 2003 at Night Club "COMBO" in Kaunas, Lithuania.

Results

Rings Lithuania: Rampage 2

Rings Lithuania: Rampage 2 was an event held on August 3, 2003 at the Kupeta Bar in Palanga, Lithuania.

Results

Rings Holland: The Untouchables

Rings Holland: The Untouchables was an event held on September 27, 2003 at Vechtsebanen Sport Hall in Utrecht, Netherlands.

Results

Rings Holland: I Have a Dream

Rings Holland: I Have a Dream was an event held on November 30, 2003 in Enschede, Holland.

Results

See also 
 Fighting Network Rings
 List of Fighting Network Rings events

References

Fighting Network Rings events
2003 in mixed martial arts